Tsaryov or Tsarev (from царь meaning czar) is a Russian masculine surname, its feminine counterpart is Tsaryova or Tsareva. Notable people with the surname include:

Galina Tsareva (born 1950), Soviet sprint cyclist
Larisa Tsaryova (born 1958), Russian swimmer
Michail Tsarev (born 1986), Russian mixed martial artist
Oleg Tsaryov (born 1970), Ukrainian businessman
Valentina Tsaryova (1926–2015), Soviet cross country skier 
Viktor Tsaryov (1931–2017), Russian football player 
Viktor Tsaryov (1939–2020), Soviet sprint canoeist
Vyacheslav Tsaryov (1971–2010), Russian football player 
Andrei Tsaryov (1977) (born 1977), Russian former professional ice hockey forward
Andrei Tsaryov (1975) (born 1975), Russian former professional ice hockey goaltender
Andrei Tsaryov (born 1975), Russian science fiction author

Russian-language surnames